The discography of Japanese pop group AAA includes eleven studio albums, six extended plays, seven compilation albums, eight live albums, one cover album, three remix albums, and 52 singles. All of the group's releases have been with Avex Trax, a subsidiary of Avex Group.

Albums

Studio albums

Extended plays

Compilation albums

Live albums

Cover albums

Remix albums

Singles

As a lead artist

2000s

2010s

Other singles

Digital singles

Other charted songs

See also
 AAA videography
 Discography

Notes

References

Discographies of Japanese artists
Pop music group discographies